Anibal Lopez (born August 24, 1942) is an American bodybuilder. He was born in Río Piedras, Puerto Rico to Francisco and Francisca Lopez. His family relocated to Bronx, New York in 1954 where he attended Public School 66, Herman Ridder Junior High School (Public School 98), and Christopher Columbus High School (Bronx).

Early life and interest in bodybuilding
As a boy, Anibal was fascinated with men of great muscular power who could perform amazing feats of strength. He read about Tarzan’s adventures in the comic books and watched former Olympic swimmerJohnny Weissmuller play the hero in the popular movie series.  The first sport young Lopez participated in was gymnastics.  He continued, however to be drawn to the “Strongmen”. His first glimpse of a bodybuilding icon was of Steve Reeves playing Hercules on the silver screen. Lopez would later recall, “That was when the bodybuilding ‘bug’ really bit me.” Amazingly, decades later, Reeves himself would tell Lopez that he considered him to be one of his favorite bodybuilders.

Another early motivation for Anibal was seeing a guest posing exhibition by IFBB Hall of Fame bodybuilder Leroy Colbert, yet another childhood hero that decades later would become a personal friend.

Lopez served in the United States Army with the 101st Airborne Division; He found that he loved the challenge of jumping out of an aircraft in flight. He later served with the 19th Special Forces Group (Airborne) in the National Guard and was credited with over 100 jumps, including 10 night jumps all from different aircraft.

The next sport that Lopez excelled at was boxing.  It wasn’t long, however, before his passion for both weightlifting and bodybuilding began to overtake his other sporting activities. He began to train at home with a barbell, a pair of dumbbells that he ordered from a Joe Weider magazine for $19.95 and a homemade wood bench.

It was while living in the Throgsneck Projects in the Bronx that Lopez accelerated his weight training.  He moved past using the meager equipment at home and started training at the sports center in the projects.  It was at this time that he began to see impressive changes in his physique, both in size and strength. During this period of training at the Throgsneck center he won his first trophy in powerlifting.

Career
Lopez joined the AAU and entered his first novice bodybuilding contest, the “Mr. Wagner”, named so because it was held at the Wagner Youth Center in Manhattan. To his great surprise, he won the over-all title at the show.

His singular goal after that first show was to win the Mr. New York City title.  It was the beginning of a long and successful run as a professional in the sport.

Now retired from competitive bodybuilding, Lopez continues to train and stay active in the sport. He resides in Deltona, Florida.

Contest history 

1969

Junior Mr America - AAU, 7th
Junior Mr USA - AAU, Most Muscular, 3rd
Mr USA - AAU, 6th

1970

Mr America - AAU, 6th
Mr America - AAU, Most Muscular, 10th
Junior Mr America - AAU, 3rd
Mr World - AAU, Short, 2nd

1971

Mr America - AAU, 6th
Mr East Coast - AAU, Winner 
Junior Mr America - AAU, 4th
Junior Mr USA - AAU, 3rd
Mr World - AAU, Short, 1st
Mr World - AAU, 4th

1972

Junior Mr America - AAU, 5th

1973

Mr America - AAU, 3rd
Junior Mr America - AAU, 3rd
Junior Mr America - AAU, Most Muscular, 5th
Junior Mr USA - AAU, 3rd
Junior Mr USA - AAU, Most Muscular, 5th
Mr USA - AAU, 3rd

1974

Mr America - AAU, 8th

1975

Mr America - AAU, 12th
Mr America - AAU, Short, 3rd
Mr USA - AAU, Most Muscular, 2nd
Mr USA - AAU, 2nd
Mr USA - IFBB, Short, 3rd

1976

Pro Mr America - WBBG, 4th

1977

Pro Mr America - WBBG, Short, 1st
Pro Mr World - WBBG, Did not place

1978

Pro Mr America - WBBG, Overall Winner 
Pro Mr America - WBBG, Short, 1st
Natural Mr America - NBA, Professional, 3rd
Mr Universe - NABBA, Short, 3rd
Pro Mr World - WBBG, Winner 

1979

Night of Champions - IFBB, 10th

1980

Pro Mr America - WBBG, Winner 
Grand Prix Miami - IFBB, 8th
Grand Prix Pennsylvania - IFBB, 11th
Night of Champions - IFBB, 14th
Pro Mr World - WBBG, Winner 

1981

Night of Champions - IFBB, 14th

2013
National Fitness Hall of Fame - Inductee

See also 
 List of male professional bodybuilders

Notes and references

External links 
 Anibal Lopez Official Website

1942 births
Living people
Members of the United States Army Special Forces
Puerto Rican Army personnel
Puerto Rican bodybuilders
Professional bodybuilders
People from Deltona, Florida
People from Río Piedras, Puerto Rico
United States Army soldiers